Castlevania Chronicles is a video game compilation developed by Konami Computer Entertainment Tokyo for the PlayStation. It consists of two game modes: Original Mode, which is a port of the 1993 platform video game  for the Sharp X68000 home computer, and Arrange Mode, a modernized remake featuring a new introductory cinematic, new sprites, and re-balanced gameplay among other adjustments. The Sharp X68000 version of Akumajō Dracula is, itself, an updated remake of the original Castlevania for the NES, where the vampire hunter Simon Belmont must defeat Dracula and save Transylvania. The compilation was later released for the PlayStation Network as a PSone Classic in December 2008.

Gameplay
Akumajō Dracula was designed to take advantage of the Sharp X68000 hardware with an updated, more complex game engine than the original Castlevania. This allowed for stages to be redesigned to accommodate intricate, dynamic obstacles, as well as the creation of new stages exclusive to this version of the game. It retains all special items and sub-weapons from the original, as well as introducing the new rare item known as the herb, which can refill player health in exchange for hearts. Hidden items worth points and 1-ups appear throughout the game should the player duck or stand in particular locations. Additionally, the game retains Castlevania's "looping" feature, where the game will keep track of how many stages a player has cleared on consecutive playthroughs before reaching a Game Over. However, unlike the original Castlevania's single higher difficulty setting activated at the start of a second playthrough, the Sharp X68000 Akumajō Dracula allows for six consecutive playthroughs of increasing difficulty before reaching its difficulty cap.

Due to Sharp X68000 Akumajō Dracula's reputation for being extremely difficult, Castlevania Chronicles features an Arrange Mode that adjusts game balance for a more accessible experience. Completing "Arrange Mode" unlocks special features including an art gallery as well as a "Time Attack Mode". Exclusive to the U.S. and European versions of Chronicles, the art gallery features artwork by Ayami Kojima for Chronicles and Castlevania: Symphony of the Night, as well as an interview with Koji Igarashi (IGA). The "Time Attack Mode" allows the player to race through any stage, complete with a time meter, to beat their best time.

Audio
The music for the X68000 game contains a variety of new arrangements of familiar tunes from the series as well as brand new compositions altogether. Before each game, the player is given a choice between three different sound modules: the X68000's FM Synthesizer, MIDI Roland LA (MT-32, CM-32L, CM-64) and MIDI Roland GS (SC-55, SC-33, SC-155, CM-300, CM-500). There is also a hidden General MIDI sound module option that is missing in Castlevania Chronicles. While the soundtrack will remain the same throughout the game regardless of which sound module is chosen, the instrumentation may vary and some songs will be arranged slightly differently. Sōta Fujimori, staff composer for the Konami Corporation in Japan, performed all new arrangements of the soundtrack for Castlevania Chronicles''' "Arrange Mode". In the Japanese Chronicles, unlike the US and European versions, the sound hardware selection screen automatically appears before starting a game on "Original Mode" just as it did in Castlevania (X68000). A code must be entered to reach it in either mode in the U.S. and European versions, while the Japanese version only requires one to be entered in "Arrange Mode". Audio-wise, the Japanese version of Chronicles had slowdown issues with the music playback. These were fixed for the U.S. and European releases.

Development
The PlayStation re-release, Castlevania Chronicles, expanded much more to the X68000 game. This includes a new rendered intro and ending, with new character designs by Ayami Kojima for Simon Belmont and Dracula, improved graphical effects, enhanced music and sound effects, and a more balanced and adjustable difficulty level. Players can choose to play this "Arrange Mode" version of the game with all of the new features intact, or play the "Original Mode" version as it was originally presented on the Sharp X68000.

While the "Original Mode" presented on Chronicles is otherwise identical to the X68000 game, there are a few limitations since it is emulated on different hardware. One noticeable difference is the brief loading times that now appear before boss fights and stages. The other drawback is the lack of an internal clock on the PlayStation. The original game utilized the X68000's internal time and date settings; the time on the clock tower during the boss fight on stage 15 would reflect the X68000's current time and the color scheme used on the painting in stage 21 would reflect one of the four seasons according to the computer's current date. On the PlayStation game, each time the system is turned on, the time and date have to be manually adjusted only after a hidden "Extra Option" menu is accessed by inputting an altered version of the Konami Code.

ReceptionCastlevania Chronicles has been met with mixed to positive reviews. IGN rated the PlayStation release 7.8, saying it was "a lot of fun". GameSpot gave that same release a 6.1, saying it lacked replay value and was graphically outdated. Game Informers Tim Turi felt that it wasn't the worst option for people who wanted a classic Castlevania.

Scott Steinberg reviewed the PlayStation version of the game for Next Generation, rating it three stars out of five, and stated that "Grade-A smack for Castlevania'' collectors, and a damn fine experiment in classic gaming for everyone else."

Notes

References

1993 video games
Chronicles
PlayStation Network games
PlayStation (console) games
X68000 games
Video game remakes
Video games developed in Japan
Video games scored by Taro Kudo
Platform games
Single-player video games